Naria marginalis is a species of sea snail, a cowry, a marine gastropod mollusk in the family Cypraeidae, the cowries.

Description

Distribution
This species is distributed in the Indian Ocean along Kenya, Mozambique, Somalia, South Africa and Tanzania.

References

 Berry, L.E. (1954). Africa's rarest cowries. JEANHS XXII (95): 82–85

Cypraeidae
Gastropods described in 1817